The Politics of Henan Province in the People's Republic of China is structured in a dual party-government system like all other governing institutions in mainland China.

The Governor of Henan is the highest-ranking official in the People's Government of Henan. However, in the province's dual party-government governing system, the Governor has less power than the Henan Chinese Communist Party (CCP) Provincial Committee Secretary, colloquially termed the "Henan CCP Party Chief".

List of the CCP Party chiefs
Zhang Xi: May 1949-November 1952
Pan Fusheng: November 1952-August 1958
Wu Zhipu: August 1958-July 1961
Liu Jianxun: July 1961-September 1966
Wen Minsheng, acting: September 1966-August 1967
Liu Jianxun: March 1971-October 1978
Duan Junyi: October 1978-January 1981
Liu Jie: January 1981-April 1985
Yang Xizong: April 1985-March 1990
Hou Zongbin: March 1990-December 1992
Li Changchun: December 1992-March 1998
Ma Zhongchen: March 1998-October 2000
Chen Kuiyuan: October 2000-December 2002
Li Keqiang: December 2002-December 2004
Xu Guangchun: December 2004-December 2009
Lu Zhangong: 2009–2013
Guo Gengmao: 2013–2016
Xie Fuzhan: 2016–2018
Wang Guosheng: 2018–2021
Lou Yangsheng: 2021–

List of governors
Wu Zhipu: 1949–1962
Wen Minsheng: 1962–1967
Liu Jianxun: 1968–1978
Duan Junyi: 1978–1979
Liu Jie: 1979–1981
Dai Suli (acting): 1981–1982
Yu Mingtao (acting): 1982–1983
He Zhukang: 1983–1987
Cheng Weigao: 1987–1990
Li Changchun: 1990–1993
Ma Zhongchen: 1993–1998
Li Keqiang: 1998–2003
Li Chengyu: 2003–2008
Guo Gengmao: 2008–2013
Xie Fuzhan: 2013–2016
Chen Run'er: 2016–2019
Yin Hong: 2019–2021
Wang Kai: 2021–

List of chairmen of Henan People's Congress
Hu Lijiao: 1979–1981
Liu Jie: 1981–1983
Zhao Wenfu: 1983–1985
Zhang Shude: 1985–1988
Lin Xiao: 1988–1989
Yang Xizong: 1989–1992
Lin Xiao: 1992–1993
Li Changchun: 1993–1998
Ren Keli: 1998–2003
Li Keqiang: 2003–2005
Xu Guangchun: 2005–2010
Lu Zhangong: 2010–2014
Guo Gengmao: 2013–2016
Xie Fuzhan: 2016–2018
Wang Guosheng: 2018–incumbent

List of chairmen of CPPCC Henan Committee
Pan Fusheng: 1955–1959
Wu Zhipu: 1959–1962
Liu Jianxun: 1962–1966, 1977–1979
Zhao Wenfu: 1979–1983
Wang Huayun: 1983–1985
Song Yuxi: 1985–1988
Yan Jimin: 1988–1993
Lin Yinghai: 1993–2003
Fan Qinchen: 2003–2006
Wang Quanshu: 2006–2011
Ye Dongsong: 2011–2018
Liu Wei: 2018–incumbent

Henan
Henan